Genaro García (September 17, 1977 in Chihuahua, Mexico – June 21, 2013) was a professional boxer in the super flyweight and bantamweight divisions from 1994 to 2013, holding the World Boxing Council Fecombox regional bantamweight title from 2003 to 2007. Known by his nickname 'Poblanito', Garcia fought for world titles against Samson Dutch Boy Gym (WBF), Hozumi Hasagawa (WBC), and Luis Alberto Perez (IBF) during his career. His career record was 39 wins and 10 losses with 23 knockouts, including a seventh round knockout over Eduardo Garcia (no relation), a fighter with a winning record, in his final ring appearance in December 2012.

Death in Mexico
García, 35, was beaten, and then shot four times in the head and killed after being pulled from his car by masked men in a van on June 21, 2013. His body was found on a nearby farm where he was taken and killed, located behind a church in San Lorenzo, Puebla, Mexico.

See also
List of unsolved murders

References

External links
 

1977 births
2013 deaths
Boxers from Chihuahua (state)
Bantamweight boxers
Deaths by firearm in Mexico
Male murder victims
Mexican murder victims
People murdered in Mexico
Mexican male boxers